Exotica is a 1994 Canadian psychological drama film written and directed by Atom Egoyan, and starring Bruce Greenwood, Mia Kirshner, Don McKellar, Arsinée Khanjian, and Elias Koteas. Set primarily in the fictional Exotica strip club in Toronto, the film concerns a father grieving over the loss of a child and obsessed with a young stripper. It was inspired by Egoyan's curiosity about the role strip clubs play in sex-obsessed societies. Exotica was filmed in Toronto in 1993.

Marketed as an erotic thriller on its release in Canada and the United States, the film proved to be a major box office success for English-language Canadian cinema, and received positive reviews. It won numerous awards, including the FIPRESCI Prize at the Cannes Film Festival and eight Genie Awards, including Best Motion Picture.

Plot 
Francis Brown, a tax auditor for Revenue Canada, is a regular visitor to a Toronto strip club called Exotica. He always has Christina, an exotic dancer dressed in a schoolgirl uniform, give him a private dance. This inspires the jealousy of the club's DJ, Eric, Christina's former boyfriend who has also impregnated the club's owner, Zoe. While at the club, Francis pays his brother Harold's teenage daughter, Tracey, to "babysit". However, Francis has no children and the girl merely practices music alone on his piano until Francis returns and drives her home. Francis' relationship with Harold is strained, as Francis learned that Harold and Francis' wife were having an affair after she died in a car accident, which also left Harold a paraplegic. Francis' daughter Lisa was kidnapped and murdered a few months before the accident, and he was one of the suspects but was later exonerated. These events have left a huge psychological scar on Francis.

In his professional life, Francis is sent to audit an exotic pet store owned and operated by Thomas Pinto, an introverted gay man profiting from the illegal import of a rare bird species. Thomas has been smuggling hyacinth macaw eggs, and his operation has afforded him hundreds of thousands of dollars a year, spurring suspicion from Canadian authorities. Francis soon discovers these illegal activities in Thomas' financial records.

Francis is eventually banned from Exotica when Eric manipulates him into touching Christina during one of her dances, violating the club's rules. Having realized that Eric intentionally set out to get Francis banned from the club, he vows to murder him. Armed with the knowledge of Thomas's tax evasion, Francis blackmails Thomas into visiting Exotica, and instructs him to touch Christina during one of her dances, so that Thomas too will be thrown out of the club; Francis intends to use this as an opportunity to infiltrate the club and murder Eric.

Francis affixes Thomas with a wiretap so that he can listen in on Thomas's visit to Exotica. While Christina gives Thomas a lap dance, he attempts to glean information from her, and the two have a conversation which Francis listens to from his parked car. Christina explains to Thomas that she and Francis share a relationship of mutual dependency, and reveals to Thomas personal details about Francis's life, specifically his daughter's murder. A distraught Francis exits his car and waits for Eric outside the club. Confronting Eric with a gun, Francis is defused when Eric reveals he and Christina, who met each other while volunteering in a search party for the missing Lisa, were the ones who discovered Lisa's dead body. Francis embraces Eric.

In a flashback, Francis drives a teenage Christina—who, at that time, worked for Francis and his wife as Lisa's babysitter—to her parents' home. During these routine drives, Francis would often comfort Christina over her troubled home life. As Francis drops Christina off at her house, he assures her that she can always confide in him.

Cast

Production

Development 

Director Atom Egoyan, who wrote the screenplay, first conceived of the story in the fall of 1992, intrigued by the ritualistic nature of table dances and the rule that clients can not touch the dancers, envisioning a story of a dancer having a main customer. He believed a strip club could be an important setting for a film because of society's sexual obsessions, and the roles of such clubs as "a collective sexual outlet". While wanting to portray the clubs accurately, he also believed he could bring a skeptical perspective.

He began working on the screenplay in February 1993. In writing it, he "wanted to structure the story like a striptease, gradually revealing an emotionally loaded history". He also cited thriller films as an influence. Although the city in the film is not named, Egoyan stated Exotica and his other films portray "different areas of Toronto".

The film had a $2 million budget, with $900,000 coming from Telefilm Canada and the Ontario Film Development Corporation pledging $700,000. To save money, Egoyan's own 1990 Volvo 240 station wagon was used as Francis's car.

Casting 
With the script completed in April 1993, Egoyan began casting the film and choosing his crew, a process that took two months.

Egoyan's wife Arsinée Khanjian played the club owner Zoe, having appeared in all of his previous films. Zoe is pregnant with Eric's child, and in reality, Khanjian was pregnant during filming, with Egoyan's son Arshile. Egoyan later expressed regret for surrounding Khanjian with nude women when she was unsure how her own body would change during her first pregnancy.

Bruce Greenwood was cast in the film after he met Egoyan through a mutual friend in a bar, before the director had raised his international profile. Greenwood had previously appeared in St. Elsewhere and Knots Landing, and the two became friends.

Filming 
Art directors Richard Paris and Linda Del Rosario built the Exotica strip club set in an unused room in the Party Centre, a Toronto building, with construction commencing in May 1993. During production, several people arrived at the set believing it was a real club. For the outside of the club, the filmmakers used a shop on Mutual Street which has since been torn down, outside Metropolitan United Church. Osgoode Hall is used for the opera house.

The cinematography was done by Paul Sarossy, with Egoyan saying the goal of the camerawork was to capture the perspective of a missing character, in this case Francis' dead daughter. Principal photography was completed by July. Composer Mychael Danna recorded his score for the film from India, with influences from classical music in India.

Release 
Exotica was invited to compete in the Cannes Film Festival in May 1994, the first invitation for a Canadian film in several years. The film was released on three screens in Toronto by Alliance Communications Corporation on September 29, 1994. In the United States, the film was initially released by Miramax Films in six cities; its distributors were impressed when Exotica grossed $14,379 per screen, allowing for a broader release to 433 screens. Miramax Films marketed the film as an erotic thriller. The film played in Toronto for 25 weeks, at one point in an IMAX theatre. In the United States, it was initially released in 500 theatres. In the Philippines, the film was released on July 27, 1995, with ads containing the tagline, "After Schindler's List and Belle Époque comes another controversial and multi-awarded hot film."

Box office 
The film grossed $32,856 in its opening weekend in Toronto. The film's initial box office performance in its limited release was considered "huge" by distributors. In March 1995, U.S. critic Roger Ebert reported Exotica was breaking box office records in Canada.

By 1995, Exotica had grossed $1.75 million in Canada, a substantial sum for English-language Canadian cinema. The film ended its run after grossing $5.13 million in the United States and Canada. Exotica was Egoyan's biggest financial success, and has been called his box-office breakthrough.

Critical reception 

Exotica received positive reviews from critics. Rotten Tomatoes retrospectively collected 37 reviews and gave the film an approval rating of 95%, with an average rating of 8.3/10. The website's critics consensus reads, "Exotica simmers with sex and obsession, while successfully doubling as an extreme character study." Roger Ebert gave the film four stars upon the film's initial release, calling it "a movie labyrinth, winding seductively into the darkest secrets of a group of people who should have no connection with one another, but do". He judged it Egoyan's best film to date and said Mia Kirshner "combines sexual allure with a kindness that makes her all the more appealing". In 2009, Ebert added the film to his Great Movies list, calling it a "deep, painful film about those closed worlds of stage-managed lust". Jonathan Rosenbaum called it "A must-see" and "lush and affecting", praising the score, the set and the camera movements. Leonard Klady, writing for Variety, called it "a haunting, chilling experience", albeit with an ending that was "anticlimactic, fuzzy and considerably less than a knockout emotional punch". Entertainment Weekly gave the film a B+, concluding "Like Christina's dance, the movie is a gorgeous tease, an artful promise of something that never quite arrives". Desson Howe, writing for The Washington Post, said it "starts off promisingly, but eventually sinks into its own convoluted oblivion". Peter Travers of Rolling Stone wrote "Exotica is Egoyan's most accomplished and seductive film to date", and less flashy than the upcoming Showgirls (1995) promised to be. B. Ruby Rich of The Advocate wrote the film is "a jigsaw puzzle of the emotions in which sex spells out whole language of human behavior", and said the cast, including Kirshner and Don McKellar, "rivet our attention on these characters". Critics complimented use of the song "Everybody Knows" by Leonard Cohen.

In 2001, Girish Shambu, writing for Senses of Cinema, said "Atom Egoyan's sad, elegant Exotica (1994) is at once intimate and remote, concrete and abstract", praising Bruce Greenwood for "quiet gravity" and Sarah Polley as "precociously perfect". In 2002, readers of Playback voted it the seventh greatest Canadian film ever made. In 2012, Jeff Heinrich of the Montreal Gazette gave the film five stars, calling it "An utterly hypnotic, X-rated art film" with a "haunting score". Mike D'Angelo of The A.V. Club stated "Exotica —much like Egoyan’s subsequent film, The Sweet Hereafter— proves to be a devastatingly cathartic exploration of tragedy's aftermath and the ways that people attempt to cope with inexpressible grief". In 2015, The Daily Telegraph named Exotica as one of "the 10 best (and worst) stripper movies", calling Egoyan "a then-wunderkind of Canadian cinema" and noting the film won awards at both Cannes and the AVN Awards, which are for pornography.

Accolades 

At the 1994 Cannes Film Festival, Exotica won the FIPRESCI Prize, the first time an English-language Canadian film had won the honour. At the 1994 Genie Awards, the film won eight prizes, including Best Motion Picture and Best Director and Best Original Screenplay for Egoyan.

Home media
On home video, Exotica went out of print in Canada for years, but was available on DVD in England through the company Network. In 2012, Alliance Films released the film on DVD and Blu-ray in Canada, with commentary from Egoyan and Danna. The Criterion Collection released the film on Blu-ray and DVD on September 20, 2022 in the United States.

References

Sources

External links 
 
 
 
 
 Exotica: Formula for Seduction – an essay by Jason Wood at The Criterion Collection

1994 films
1994 drama films
1994 independent films
1994 LGBT-related films
1994 thriller films
1990s Canadian films
1990s English-language films
1990s erotic drama films
1990s erotic thriller films
1990s psychological drama films
1990s psychological thriller films
1990s thriller drama films
AVN Award winners
Best Picture Genie and Canadian Screen Award winners
Canadian erotic drama films
Canadian erotic thriller films
Canadian independent films
Canadian LGBT-related films
Canadian nonlinear narrative films
Canadian psychological drama films
Canadian psychological thriller films
Canadian thriller drama films
English-language Canadian films
Films about striptease
Films directed by Atom Egoyan
Films scored by Mychael Danna
Films set in Toronto
Films shot in Toronto
Hyperlink films
LGBT-related thriller drama films
Miramax films